István Básti (born 19 September 1944 in Salgótarján) is a Hungarian footballer. He was born in Salgótarján in Nógrád County. He competed at the 1968 Summer Olympics in Mexico City, where he won a gold medal with the Hungarian team.

References

1944 births
Living people
People from Salgótarján
Hungarian footballers
Olympic footballers of Hungary
Salgótarjáni BTC footballers
Footballers at the 1968 Summer Olympics
Footballers at the 1972 Summer Olympics
Olympic gold medalists for Hungary
Olympic silver medalists for Hungary
Olympic medalists in football
Medalists at the 1972 Summer Olympics
Medalists at the 1968 Summer Olympics
Association football forwards
Sportspeople from Nógrád County